The Oxyrhynchus hymn (or P. Oxy. XV 1786) is the earliest known manuscript of a Christian Greek hymn to contain both lyrics and musical notation. The papyrus on which the hymn was written dates from around the end of the 3rd century AD. It is on Papyrus 1786 of the Oxyrhynchus papyri, now kept at the Papyrology Rooms of the Sackler Library, Oxford. The manuscript was discovered in 1918 in Oxyrhynchus, Egypt, and later published in 1922.

Description
The lyrics of the Oxyrhynchus hymn were written in Greek, and poetically invoke silence for the praise of the Holy Trinity (i.e. cosmic stillness, a motif of ancient Greek hymnody). Historically, the hymn demonstrates Greek civilizational continuity where erudite Christian Greeks used and accepted the musical notation of their classical Greek predecessors.

The music is written in Greek vocal notation. It is entirely diatonic, with an ambitus of exactly an octave from F to F an octave above, and a final nominally on G (assuming a key signature without sharps or flats). The notation is Hypolydian, and employs the rhythmic symbols macron (diseme), leimma + macron, stigme, hyphen, and colon. The text is largely set syllabically, with a few short melismas. The hymn's meter is essentially anapaestic, though there are some irregularities.

The Oxyrhynchus hymn is the only surviving fragment of notated Christian Greek music from the first four hundred years of the Christian period, although historian and musician Kenneth Levy has argued that the Sanctus melody best preserved in the Western medieval Requiem mass dates from around the fourth century. Modern recordings of the hymn have been included on a number of releases of Ancient Greek music.

Text
The Phos Hilaron and the Oxyrhynchus hymn constitute the earliest extant Christian Greek hymn texts reasonably certain to have been used in Christian worship, but are neither drawn from the Bible nor modeled on Biblical passages.

 . . . together all the eminent ones of God. . .
 . . . night] nor day (?) Let it/them be silent. Let the luminous stars not [. . .],
 . . . [Let the rushings of winds, the sources] of all surging rivers [cease]. While we hymn 
 Father and Son and Holy Spirit, let all the powers answer, "Amen, amen, Strength, praise,
 [and glory forever to God], the sole giver of all good things. Amen, amen."

See also
Oxyrhynchus papyri

References

Citations

Sources

Discography
 Ensemble Kérylos a music group directed by scholar Annie Bélis and dedicated to the recreation of ancient Greek and Roman music. 1996. "Hymne chrétienne d'Oxyrhynchus." Musique de l'Antiquité grecque. K617.069.
Atrium Musicæ de Madrid, Gregorio Paniagua. 1979. "Christian Hymn of Oxyrhynchus." Musique de la Grèce Antique. Harmonia Mundi (France) HMA 1901015. Arles: Harmonia Mundi.
Christodoulos Halaris. 1992. "Hymn to the Holy Trinity". Music of Ancient Greece. Orata ORANGM 2013. [Greece]: Orata Ltd.
Ensemble De Organographia. 1995. "Christian hymn, Anonymous (3rd c. AD) Oxyrhynchus papyrus 1786." Music of the Ancient Greeks. Pandourion PRCD1001. Oregon City: Pandourion Records. Track sample available at: http://www.liturgica.com/Home/litEChLit

External links

 Oxyrhynchus 1786 at Oxyrhynchus Online, with low-resolution and high-resolution images of the papyrus itself.

Greek Christian hymns
1786
3rd-century Christian texts
3rd century in music
Ancient music genres
Ancient Christian texts
Ancient Greek music
Sackler library manuscripts